Odin Sivertsen (1 August 1914 – 24 March 2008) was a Norwegian politician for the Anders Lange Party.

He served as a deputy representative to the Parliament of Norway from Rogaland during the term 1973–1977. In total he met during 20 days of parliamentary session.

References

1914 births
2008 deaths
Deputy members of the Storting
Progress Party (Norway) politicians
Rogaland politicians